WUPI (92.1 FM; "The Owl") is an American radio station licensed in Presque Isle, Maine carrying a top 40 format and operated by the University of Maine at Presque Isle. The station has an ERP of 17 watts with studios in Pullen Hall at UMPI.

History
WUPI was licensed July 26, 1973, broadcasting at 91.1 MHz with 10 watts of power. WUPI switched channels in April 1978 moving to 90.3 MHz, and finally went to 92.1 MHz in 1983, which included an upgrade to 17 watts. In July 2006, the station was moved from its previous location in the basement of Normal Hall to a new home at the center of the University of Maine at Presque Isle in the Campus Center. In December 2009, the station moved once again to a larger facility in Normal Hall, in order to combine student media resources for the University. After playing a hybrid of Adult Contemporary and Top 40 for about 10 months in 2010, the switch was made to Contemporary Hit Radio (CHR) on Wednesday, September 15. The station was also installed with a computerized automation system. In October 2010, the station added online streaming capabilities with radio applications listed on TuneIn and ShoutCast. The antenna is currently located on top of Emerson Hall.

In September 2016 the station moved to Pullen Hall with the closure of the building Normal Hall. The station currently broadcasts from Pullen 209 in the classroom building at the University of Maine at Presque Isle.

In September 2018, WUPI switched it's slogan from "Presque Isle's New #1 Hit Music Station" to "UMPI & Presque Isle's #1 Hit Music Station"

On May 1, 2019, WUPI released a new logo created by the Marketing Club at University of Maine at Presque Isle.

References

External links

UPI
University of Maine at Presque Isle
Presque Isle, Maine
Radio stations established in 1973
1973 establishments in Maine
UPI